John Armitage may refer to:
John Armitage (architect) (1874–?), British architect
John Armitage (banker) (born 1959), British hedge fund manager
John Armitage (politician) (1920–2009), Australian politician
John Armitage (editor) (1910–1980), British editor of Encyclopædia Britannica
Jack Armitage (1897–?), English footballer

See also
John Armytage (disambiguation)
Armitage (surname)